River Nasino (July 1, 2020 – October 9, 2020) was a Filipino infant who died in a Manila hospital after suffering from acute respiratory distress syndrome while her mother Reina Mae Nasino was detained for illegal possession of firearms and explosives. The baby's death sparked condemnation from progressive groups due to the police handling involved during the baby's funeral and burial.

Background 
The 23-year-old pregnant human rights worker Reina Mae Nasino and two other activists were arrested at Tondo, Manila on November 5, 2019 and detained at the Manila City Jail for illegal possession of firearms and explosives, a non-bailable offense. However, the detainees' lawyers asserted that the firearms and other weapons were planted. During the custody, River Nasino was born prematurely on July 1, 2020 at the Dr. Jose Fabella Memorial Hospital and was later diagnosed with acute gastroenteritis. Reina pleaded that the baby should be allowed stay on her side until at least six months old. Despite this, the baby was forcibly separated on August 13, 2020, despite the pleas that the baby is not healthy to separate a breastfeeding infant from her mother. A month later, River was brought to the hospital after she had shown signs of COVID-19; she tested negative for the virus. She died on October 9, 2020. At the day of the baby's death, her mother asked to the court to let her see her daughter.

Funeral 
The Manila Regional Trial Court only gave Nasino a six-hour furlough (three hours for the wake and another three hours for the burial), which was reduced from three days, to allow her to visit her daughter's funeral. The funeral of River was held on October 14, 2020 at the La Funeraria Rey in Pandacan, where police had deployed 20 personnel there, as well as SWAT members. Reina Nasino visited wake of her daughter, wearing full personal protective equipment (PPE) while handcuffed. Only the family members were allowed inside the wake. Nasino was also caught in the video begging on her knees on the police to allow the procession to start at 11:30am, an hour before Nasino's three-hour furlough would start. In addition, the police barred progressive groups from holding protest placards outside the funeral home. However, tension arose when the police escorts prevented her from interviewing the media. A video from CNN Philippines showing the Chevrolet Suburban hearse carrying River's remains sped up during the procession, leaving the relatives behind. The police denied the allegations of maltreatment, saying that the deployment of personnel was to ensure the safety of the detainee.

It was reported that 43 police personnel were deployed for the burial of the baby. During the burial of the baby at the Manila North Cemetery, Nasino's parents and lawyers pleaded the police to remove her handcuffs so she can hug the coffin for the last time but the police refused. The mother of the detainee, Marites Asis, expressed her displeasure over what happened to the burial as they were forced to run after the hearse after it had sped up.

In the aftermath, the Nasino family planned to file a case against the personnel of the Bureau of Jail Management and Penology and the Philippine National Police (PNP) for the "grotesque and barbaric" act against the detainee.

Reactions 
On October 15, 2020, The College Editors Guild of the Philippines denounced the treatment of Reina Nasino and held the Duterte government liable for depriving her of her "right to free expression".

Hashtags #JusticeForBabyRiver and #FreeReinaMaeNasino, as well as #OustDuterteNOW trended on Twitter on October 16, 2020 in response to the police handling of the burial. Militant mass organizations Anakbayan and Gabriela strongly condemned the police handling of River's funeral, the latter calling it a "brutal takeover", while activist group Karapatan blamed the Duterte administration for the baby's death and slammed the reduction of her furlough, calling it "gross injustice and heartless". Carlos Conde of the Human Rights Watch also condemned the baby's death, denouncing it as a "new, unconscionable low" for the Philippine government.

Vice President Leni Robredo also expressed sympathy over the death of the baby, noting that the police presence at the funeral was "overkill". Local celebrities Anne Curtis, her sister Jasmine Curtis-Smith, Bianca Gonzalez, and director Antoinette Jadaone also condemned the police handling at the burial. Justice Secretary Menardo Guevarra said that the case against the detained activist will proceed, adding that the department "sympathize with the accused for her personal loss". Migrante International called for the justice of the baby and the release of the detainee. Human rights lawyer Chel Diokno on his Twitter account also denounced the actions of the police, noting that despite the law, what had transpired to both Reina and River was "cruel". Renato Reyes Jr. of Bayan reacted on the burial, stating that "we will never forget this."

In October 18, 2020, Metropolitan Manila Development Authority (MMDA) spokesperson Celine Pialago, through her Facebook account, said that Nasino's supporters "should scrutinize who the detained activist is" and added that the public support for the grieving activist was a "drama serye" (transl. "drama series"). However, Pialago's statement sparked outrage from social media for "disrespect" and "zero empathy" towards the grieving mother and her baby.

References 

2020 in the Philippines
2020 controversies
Controversies in the Philippines
Nasino, River
Duterte administration controversies